Law enforcement in the United States is one of three major components of the criminal justice system of the United States, along with courts and corrections. Although each component operates semi-independently, the three collectively form a chain leading from an investigation of suspected criminal activity to the administration of criminal punishment.

There are more than 800,000 sworn law enforcement officers now serving in the United States, about 12 percent of whom are women. Around 137,000 of those officers work for federal law enforcement agencies.

Law enforcement operates primarily through governmental police agencies. There are 17,985 police agencies in the United States which include municipal police departments, county sheriff's offices, state troopers, and federal law enforcement agencies. The law enforcement purposes of these agencies are the investigation of suspected criminal activity, referral of the results of investigations to state or federal prosecutors, and the temporary detention of suspected criminals pending judicial action. Law enforcement agencies, to varying degrees at different levels of government and in different agencies, are also commonly charged with the responsibilities of deterring criminal activity and preventing the successful commission of crimes in progress. Other duties may include the service and enforcement of warrants, writs, and other orders of the courts. 

Law enforcement agencies are also involved in providing first response to emergencies and other threats to public safety; the protection of certain public facilities and infrastructure, such as private property; the maintenance of public order; the protection of public officials; and the operation of some detention facilities (usually at the local level).

Types of law enforcement agencies
Policing in the United States is conducted by "around 18,000 federal, state and local law enforcement agencies, all with their own rules". Every state has its own nomenclature for agencies, and their powers, responsibilities and funding vary from state to state. 2008 census data from the Department of Justice's Bureau of Justice Statistics (BJS) revealed that this constitutes:

 73 federal agencies
 50 primary state law enforcement agencies
 638 other state agencies
 1,733 special jurisdiction agencies
 3,063 sheriff's offices
 12,501 municipal, county, tribal, and regional police departments

Federal

At the federal level, there exists both federal police, which possess full federal authority as given to them under United States Code (U.S.C.), and federal law enforcement agencies, who are authorized to enforce various laws at the federal level. Both police and law enforcement agencies operate at the highest level and are endowed with police roles; each may maintain a small component of the other (for example, the FBI Police). The agencies have jurisdiction in all states, U.S. territories, and U.S. possessions for enforcement of federal law. Most federal agencies are limited by the U.S. Code to investigating only matters that are explicitly within the power of the federal government. However, federal investigative powers have become very broad in practice, especially since the passage of the USA PATRIOT Act. There are also federal law enforcement agencies, such as the US Park Rangers, that are granted state arrest authority off primary federal jurisdiction.

The Department of Justice (DOJ) is responsible for most law enforcement duties at the federal level. It includes the Federal Bureau of Investigation (FBI), the Drug Enforcement Administration (DEA), the Bureau of Alcohol, Tobacco, Firearms, and Explosives (ATF), the United States Marshals Service, the Federal Bureau of Prisons (BOP), and others.

The Department of Homeland Security (DHS) is another branch with numerous federal law enforcement agencies reporting to it. U.S. Border Patrol (USBP), U.S. Immigration and Customs Enforcement (ICE), United States Secret Service (USSS), United States Coast Guard (USCG), and the Transportation Security Administration (TSA) are some of the agencies that report to DHS. The United States Coast Guard is assigned to the United States Department of Defense in the event of war.

At a crime or disaster scene affecting large numbers of people, multiple jurisdictions, or broad geographic areas, many police agencies may be involved by mutual aid agreements. For example, the United States Federal Protective Service responded to the Hurricane Katrina natural disaster. The command in such situations remains a complex and flexible issue.

In accordance with the federal structure of the United States government, the national (federal) government is not authorized to execute general police powers by the Constitution of the United States of America. The power to have a police force is given to each of the United States' 50 federated states. The US Constitution gives the federal government the power to deal with foreign affairs and interstate affairs (affairs between the states). For police, this means that if a non-federal crime is committed in a U.S. state and the fugitive does not flee the state, the federal government has no jurisdiction. However, once the fugitive crosses a state line, he violates the federal law of interstate flight and is subject to federal jurisdiction, at which time federal law enforcement agencies may become involved.

State

Most states operate statewide law enforcement agencies that provide law enforcement duties, including investigations and state patrols. They may be called state police or highway patrol (state troopers), and are normally part of the state Department of Public Safety. In addition, the Attorney General's office of each state has its own state bureau of investigation, such as in California with the California Department of Justice. The Texas Ranger Division fulfills this role in Texas, although they were founded in the period before Texas became a state.

Various departments of state governments may have their own enforcement divisions, such as capitol police, campus police, state hospitals, department of corrections, water police, environmental (fish and game/wildlife) conservation officers, or game wardens (with full police powers and statewide jurisdiction). For example, in Colorado, the Department of Revenue has its own investigative branch.

County
Also known as parishes and boroughs, county law enforcement is provided by sheriffs' departments or offices, constables and county police.

County police

County police tend to exist only in metropolitan counties and have countywide jurisdiction. For places that have both county police and county sheriff, responsibilities are given to each: the county police are in charge of typical police duties such as patrol and investigations, whereas the sheriffs' department in this situation takes care of serving papers and providing security to the courts. County police tend to fall into three broad categories, full service, limited service, and restrictive service. Full service provides full police services to the entire county. Limited service provides to the unincorporated and special districts. Restricted service provide security to the county-owned parts of the county.

Sheriffs' offices
Sheriffs are police and have many different responsibilities. Sheriffs are elected officials where the head of police is appointed or hired in. Sheriffs are responsible for all three parts of the criminal justice system. They uphold the county jail, ensure safety within the courts, and have jurisdiction to enforce laws in the entire county. They have more responsibilities such as transporting prisoners, running crime labs, and collecting taxes.

In Texas, the sheriff's office is normally the agency responsible for handling mental health calls. If the situation is dangerous, a sheriff's deputy has the power to take a person to a hospital on a mental health commitment immediately. However, if the situation is not actively dangerous, a warrant must be sought. With the rise in mental health units across the state, the Texas CIT Association was formed.

Commonwealth of Virginia

The Commonwealth of Virginia does not have overlapping county and city jurisdictions, whereas in most other states, municipalities generally fall within (and share jurisdiction and many other governmental responsibilities with) one (or more) county(ies). In Virginia, governmental power flows down from the state (or in Virginia's case, commonwealth) directly to either a county or an independent city. Thus, policing in Virginia is more streamlined: the county sheriff's office/department or county police department does not overlap with an independent city police department. Unincorporated townships remain part of their parent county, but incorporated townships may have town police departments to augment their county law enforcement. Town police departments are often small and may deploy a combination of paid and unpaid, full and part-time law enforcement officers, including auxiliary officers who typically serve as part-time, unpaid volunteers. If present, independent city sheriff's offices usually follow the restrictive model shown above for sheriff's departments, with limited law enforcement authority including warrant service, jail bailiff, etc. Mutual assistance compacts may exist where neighboring law enforcement agencies will assist each other, however, in addition to state (commonwealth) law enforcement resources. Like most states, Virginia also has campus police officers. Under Virginia State Code 23.1-809 and 23.1-810, public and private colleges and universities can maintain their own armed police force and employ sworn campus police officers. These sworn officers have the same authority as local police and are required to complete police academy training mandated by the Virginia Department of Criminal Justice Services. Virginia campus police officers have jurisdiction on and immediately around the campus, but police departments may petition to the local circuit court for concurrent jurisdiction with the local police.

Municipal

Municipal police range from one-officer agencies (sometimes still called the town marshals) to the 40,000 person-strong New York City Police Department, which has its own counterterrorism agency. Most municipal agencies take the form (Municipality Name) Police Department. Most municipalities have their own police departments.

Metropolitan departments, such as the Las Vegas Metropolitan Police Department, have jurisdiction covering multiple communities and municipalities, often over a wide area, and typically share geographical boundaries within one or more cities or counties. Metropolitan departments have usually been formed by a merger between local agencies, typically several local police departments and often the local sheriff's department or office, in efforts to provide greater efficiency by centralizing command and resources and to resolve jurisdictional problems, often in communities experiencing rapid population growth and urban sprawl, or in neighboring communities too small to afford individual police departments. Some county sheriff's departments, such as the Los Angeles County Sheriff's Department, are contracted to provide full police services to local cities within their counties. Likewise, in Florida, the Duval County Road Patrol and the Jacksonville Police Department consolidated in 1968 to form the "Office of the Sheriff - Jacksonville Police," commonly known as the Jacksonville Sheriff's Office, policing all of Duval County.

Puerto Rico Police

The Puerto Rico Police Department (PRPD) traces back to 1837, when Spanish governor Francisco Javier de Moreda y Prieto created La Guardia Civil de Puerto Rico (Puerto Rico Civil Guard) to protect the lives and property of Puerto Ricans who at the time were Spanish subjects, and provide police services to the entire island, even though many municipalities maintained their own police force. The United States invaded and took possession of Puerto Rico in July 1898 as a result of the Spanish–American War and has controlled the island as a US territory since then. The Insular Police of Puerto Rico was created on February 21, 1899, under the command of Colonel Frank Thacher (U.S. Marine officer during the Spanish–American War), with an authorized strength of 313 sworn officers. As of 2009, the PRPD had over 17,292 officers.

Other

There are other types of specialist law enforcement agency with varying jurisdictions. Most of these serve special-purpose districts and are known as special district police. In some states, they serve as little more than security police, but in states such as California, special district forces are composed of fully sworn police officers with statewide authority.

These agencies can be transit police, school district police, campus police, airport police, harbor police, railroad police, park police or police detectives and animal control service responsible for protecting government property, such as the former Los Angeles General Services Police. Some agencies, such as the Port Authority of New York and New Jersey Police Department, have multi-state powers. There are also some private police agencies, such as the Parkchester Department of Public Safety and Co-op City Department of Public Safety.

Police functions

Textbooks and scholars have identified three primary police agency functions. The following is cited from The American System of Criminal Justice, by George F. Cole and Christopher E. Smith, 2004, 10th edition, Wadsworth/Thomson Learning:

Order maintenance This is the broad mandate to keep the peace or otherwise prevent behaviors which might disturb others. This can deal with things ranging from a barking dog to a fist-fight. By way of description, Cole and Smith note that police are usually called-on to "handle" these situations with discretion, rather than deal with them as strict violations of law, though of course their authority to deal with these situations is based in violations of law.

Law enforcement These powers are typically used only in cases where the law has been violated and a suspect must be identified and apprehended. Most obvious instances include robbery, murder, or burglary. This is the popular notion of the main police function, but the frequency of such activity depends on geography and season.

Service Services may include rendering first aid, providing tourist information, guiding the disoriented, or acting as educators (on topics such as preventing drug use). Cole and Smith cited one study which showed 80% of all calls for police assistance did not involve crimes, but this may not be the case in all parts of the country. Because police agencies are traditionally available year-round, 24 hours a day, citizens call upon police departments not only in times of trouble but also when just inconvenienced. As a result, police services may include roadside auto assistance, providing referrals to other agencies, finding lost pets or property, or checking locks on vacationers' homes.

Styles of policing

Given the broad mandates of police work and the limited resources they have, police administrators must develop policies to prioritize and focus their activities. Some of the more controversial policies restrict, or even forbid, high-speed vehicular pursuits. Researchers Falcone, Wells, & Weisheit describe a historical separation of police models between small towns and larger cities. The distinction has also been defined between rural and urban policing models, which tended to function differently with separate hierarchical systems supporting each.

Three styles of policing develop from a jurisdiction's socioeconomic characteristics, government organization, and choice of police administrators. According to a study in a book by James Q. Wilson (Varieties of Police Behavior, 1968, 1978, Harvard University Press), there were three distinct types of policing developed in his study of eight communities. Each style emphasized different police functions and was linked to specific characteristics of the community the department served.

Watchman Emphasizes maintaining order, usually found in communities with a declining industrial base, and a blue-collar, mixed ethnic/racial population. This form of policing is implicitly less pro-active than other styles, and certain offenses may be "overlooked" on a variety of social, legal, and cultural grounds as long as public order is maintained. Cole and Smith comment the broad discretion exercised in this style of policing can result in charges of discrimination when it appears police treatment of different groups results in the perception that some groups get better treatment than others.

Legalistic Emphasizes law enforcement and professionalism. This is usually found in reform-minded cities, with mixed socioeconomic composition. Officers are expected to generate a large number of arrests and citations and act as if there were a single community standard for conduct, rather than different standards for different groups. However, the fact that certain groups are more likely to have law enforcement contact means this strict enforcement of laws may seem overly harsh on certain groups.

Service Emphasizes the service functions of police work, usually found in suburban, middle-class communities where residents demand individual treatment. Police in homogeneous communities can view their work as protecting their citizens against "outsiders", with frequent but often informal interventions against community members. The uniform make-up of the community means crimes are usually more obvious, and therefore less frequent, leaving police free to deal with service functions and traffic control.

Wilson's study applies to police behavior for the entire department over time. At any given time, police officers may be acting in a watchman, service, or legalistic function by the nature of what they are doing at the time, their temperament, or their mood at the time. Individual officers may also be inclined to one style or another, regardless of the supervisor or citizen demands.

Community-oriented policing is a shift in policing practices in the U.S. that moved away from standardization and towards a more preventative model where police actively partner with the community it serves.

History

Early colonial policing

Policing in what would become the United States of America arose from the law enforcement systems in European countries, particularly the ancient English common law system. This relied heavily on citizen volunteers, as well as watch groups, constables, sheriffs, and a conscription system known as posse comitatus similar to the militia system.

An early night watch formed in Boston in 1631, and in 1634 the first U.S. constable on record was Joshua Pratt, in the Plymouth Colony. Constables were tasked with surveying land, serving warrants, and enforcing punishments.

A rattlewatch was formed in New Amsterdam, later to become New York City, in 1651. The New York rattlewatch "strolled the streets to discourage crime and search for lawbreakers" and also served as town criers. In 1658, they began drawing pay, making them the first municipally funded police organization.  When the English captured New Amsterdam in 1664, they installed a constable whose duties included keeping the peace, suppressing excessive drinking, gambling, prostitution, and preventing disturbances during church services.
A night watch was formed in Philadelphia in 1700. 

In the Southern colonies, formal slave patrols were created as early as 1704 in the Carolinas in order to prevent slave rebellions and enslaved people from escaping. By 1785 the Charleston Guard and Watch had "a distinct chain of command, uniforms, sole responsibility for policing, salary, authorized use of force, and a focus on preventing 'crime'."

Development of modern policing

Modern policing began to emerge in the U.S. in the mid-nineteenth century, influenced by the British model of policing established in 1829 based on the Peelian principles. The first organized, publicly-funded professional full-time police services were established in Boston in 1838, New York in 1844, and Philadelphia in 1854.

Slave patrols in the south were abolished upon the abolition of slavery in the 1860s. The legal tactics of the slave patrols are reflected in the vigilante tactics of the Ku Klux Klan.

In the late 19th and early 20th century, there were few specialized units in police departments. In 1905, the Pennsylvania State Police became the first state police agency established in the United States, as recommended by President Theodore Roosevelt's Anthracite Strike Commission and Governor Samuel Pennypacker.

The advent of the police car, two-way radio, and telephone in the early 20th century transformed policing into a reactive strategy that focused on responding to calls for service. In the 1920s, led by Berkeley, California police chief August Vollmer, police began to professionalize, adopt new technologies, and place emphasis on training. With this transformation, police command and control became more centralized. Orlando Winfield Wilson, a student of Vollmer, helped reduce corruption and introduce professionalism in Wichita, Kansas, and later in the Chicago Police Department. Strategies employed by O.W. Wilson included rotating officers from community to community to reduce their vulnerability to corruption, establishing a non-partisan police board to help govern the police force, a strict merit system for promotions within the department, and an aggressive recruiting drive with higher police salaries to attract professionally qualified officers.

Despite such reforms, police agencies were led by highly autocratic leaders, and there remained a lack of respect between police and the community. During the professionalism era of policing, law enforcement agencies concentrated on dealing with felonies and other serious crime, rather than focusing on crime prevention. Following urban unrest in the 1960s, police placed more emphasis on community relations, and enacted reforms such as increased diversity in hiring. The Kansas City Preventive Patrol study in the 1970s found the reactive approach to policing to be ineffective. The cost of policing rapidly expanded during the 1960s. In 1951, American cities spent $82 per person on policing. Adjusting for inflation, police spending increased over 300% by 2016, to $286 per person.

In the 1990s, many law enforcement agencies began to adopt community policing strategies, and others adopted problem-oriented policing. In the 1990s, CompStat was developed by the New York Police Department as an information-based system for tracking and mapping crime patterns and trends, and holding police accountable for dealing with crime problems. CompStat, and other forms of information-led policing, have since been replicated in police departments across the United States.

Powers of officers

Law enforcement officers are granted certain powers to enable them to carry out their duties. When there exists probable cause to believe that a person has committed a serious crime, a misdemeanor in their presence, or a select-few misdemeanors not in their presence, a law enforcement officer can handcuff and arrest a person, who will be held in a police station or jail pending a judicial bail determination or an arraignment.
 
In 2010, the FBI estimated that law enforcement agencies made 13,120,947 arrests (excluding traffic violations). Of those persons arrested, 74.5% were male and 69.4 percent of all persons arrested were white, 28.0 percent were black, and the remaining 2.6 percent were of other races.

A law enforcement officer may briefly detain a person upon reasonable suspicion of involvement in a crime but short of probable cause to arrest. Merely lawfully detaining a person—in and of itself—does not deprive a person of their Fourth Amendment right against unlawful searches. Federal, state, and local laws, and individual law enforcement departmental policies govern when, where, how, and upon whom a law enforcement officer may perform a "pat down," "protective search," or "Terry frisk," based on several U.S. Supreme Court decisions (including Terry v. Ohio (1968), Michigan v. Long (1983), and Maryland v. Buie (1990)):
 
In Terry v. Ohio, the landmark decision introducing the term "Terry frisk", or "frisk", to the broader public (italics added):

Our evaluation of the proper balance that has to be struck in this type of case leads us to conclude that there must be a narrowly drawn authority to permit a reasonable search for weapons for the protection of the police officer, where he has reason to believe that he is dealing with an armed and dangerous individual, regardless of whether he has probable cause to arrest the individual for a crime. The officer need not be absolutely certain that the individual is armed; the issue is whether a reasonably prudent man in the circumstances would be warranted in the belief that his safety or that of others was in danger.

Controversies

Deadly force and death in custody 

In most states, law enforcement officers operate under the same self-defense laws as the general public. Generally, when the first responder or a member of the public is at risk of serious bodily injury and/or death, lethal force is justified. Most law enforcement agencies establish a use of force continuum and list deadly force as a force of last resort. With this model, agencies try to control excessive uses of force. Nonetheless, some question the number of killings by law enforcement officers, including killings of people who are unarmed, raising questions about alleged widespread and ongoing excessive use of force. Other non-fatal incidents and arrests have raised similar concerns.

The racial distribution of victims of US police lethal force is not proportionate to the racial distribution of the US population. Whites account for the largest racial group of deaths, but are under-represented, accounting for 45% of police killings (and 60% of the population). Blacks are over-represented, accounting for 24% of police killings (and 13% of the population). Hispanics are proportionately represented, accounting for 17% of police killings (and 18% of the population). Others (including Asian, Native American, and others) are under-represented, accounting for 4% of police killings (and 8% of the population).

Militarization of police

The militarization of both rural and urban law enforcement has been attributed to the United States' involvement in wars during the 20th century, although some attribute the militarization to the more recent campaigns on drugs and terror. Historian Charles Beard argued that cultural change during the Great Depression encouraged the militarization of law enforcement, whereas Harwood argues that the creation of Special Response Teams and tactical units within law enforcement during the 1960s began such a trend.

Beginning in the 1990s, the use of military equipment and tactics for community policing and for public order policing has become more widespread under the 1033 program. The program prompted discussion among lawmakers in 2014 after unrest in Ferguson, Missouri. President Obama introduced restrictions in 2015 on the transfer of surplus military equipment to police. In 2017, the Trump administration announced it would reinstate the program.

No-knock warrants 

The use of no-knock warrants has become widespread and controversial. Their use has led to misconduct, unlawful arrests, and deaths.

Qualified immunity 

The U.S. Supreme Court first introduced the qualified immunity doctrine in 1967, originally with the rationale of protecting law enforcement officials from frivolous lawsuits and financial liability in cases where they acted in good faith in unclear legal situations. Starting around 2005, courts increasingly applied the doctrine to cases involving the use of excessive or deadly force by police, leading to widespread criticism that it, in the words of a 2020 Reuters report, "has become a nearly failsafe tool to let police brutality go unpunished and deny victims their constitutional rights".

Warren v. District of Columbia 

In the 1981 case Warren v. District of Columbia, the ultimate ruling was that United States law did not require law enforcement officers to protect the general population, that ordinary citizens could not be classified as persons requiring special protection, and the officers had no legal duty to protect.

This and other cases have been used to establish legal precedents in many jurisdictions across the United States. Such precedents are often used to protect law enforcement officers and organizations from being charged with inaction during riots or mass shootings.

Civil asset forfeiture

Rules on civil asset forfeiture allow law enforcement officers to seize anything which they can plausibly claim was the proceeds of a crime. The property-owner need not be convicted of that crime; if officers find drugs in a house, they can take cash from the house and possibly the house itself. Commentators have said these rules provide an incentive for law enforcement officers to focus on drug-related crimes rather than crimes against persons, such as rape and homicide. They also provide an incentive to arrest suspected drug-dealers inside their houses, which can be seized, and to raid stash houses after most of their drugs have been sold, when officers can seize the cash.

Issues with recruitment

Despite safeguards around recruitment, some police departments have at times relaxed hiring and staffing policies, sometimes in violation of the law, most often in the cases of local departments and federally funded drug task forces facing staffing shortages, attrition, and needs to quickly fill positions. This has included at times the fielding (and sometimes the arming) of uncertified officers (who may be working temporarily in what is supposed to be a provisional limited-duty status prior to certification) and the hiring of itinerant "gypsy cops", who may have histories of poor performance or misconduct in other departments.

Other concerns 
The procedural use of strip searches and cavity searches by law enforcement has raised civil liberties concerns. The practice of taking an arrested person on a perp walk, often handcuffed, through a public place at some point after the arrest, creating an opportunity for the media to take photographs and video of the event, has also raised concerns.

The New York City Police Department came under scrutiny in 2012 for its use of a stop-and-frisk program.

Misconduct cases 

Over the past decades, police departments across the country have been affected by instances of misconduct and brutality. Some prominent examples include the following:
 1960s: The 1960s marked the height of the Civil Rights Movement, and much police misconduct came from protests that often turned violent. There were also planned attacks against police stemming directly from the force that was being used by the police against the protesters. President Lyndon Johnson created the Office of Law Enforcement Assistance in 1965. From that, much was done on the federal and local level, such as enhanced training for police personnel. Police officers at that time were often made up of ex-military members who had little training and were left to learn their skills during their job experiences. Law enforcement personnel were also responsible to attend college as a result.
 1965: The Watts Riots of 1965 lasted six days and began following the arrest of Marquette Frye by a white California Highway Patrol officer on suspicion of driving while intoxicated. 34 people were killed, and more than 1,000 were injured. The riots also caused over $40 million in damage.
 1985: On May 13, 1985, nearly five hundred police officers attempted to clear the MOVE black liberation group compound in Philadelphia, Pennsylvania. After a shootout between police and MOVE members involving automatic weapons and over 10,000 rounds fired, Commissioner Gregore Sambor ordered that the compound be bombed. Two one-pound bombs made of FBI-supplied Tovex were dropped from a police helicopter targeting a fortified, bunker-like cubicle on the roof of the house. The resulting explosions ignited a fire from fuel for a gasoline-powered generator stored in the rooftop bunker. The fire spread and eventually destroyed approximately sixty-five nearby houses. Eleven people, including five children aged 7 to 13, died in the resulting fire.
 1991: In March 1991, Officers from the Los Angeles Police Department, while attempting to arrest Rodney King, used what many believed was excessive force. Four LAPD officers used physical force on King after he resisted arrest. A bystander videotaped the incident and later supplied it to local media. The officers were charged with assault and using excessive force, with all officers acquitted of the assault, and three of the four officers acquitted of using excessive of force, during the initial trial. This led to the citywide 1992 Los Angeles riots, during which 63 people were killed and 2,373 were injured; it ended only after the California Army National Guard, the United States Army, and the United States Marine Corps provided reinforcements to re-establish control.
 2006: Sean Bell was fatally shot on the night before his wedding. It was reported that the police had shot over 50 times at Bell and two of his friends that he was with.
 2014: Michael Brown was shot by a police officer after struggling with the officer and attempting to take the officer's gun. His death prompted citywide riots and protests that lasted approximately 5 days.
 2016: Philando Castile was shot by a police officer. Due to the rise of social media and cell phones, it is now easy for people to broadcast police use of force incidents that they see. The trend started with Rodney King and has grown since. In this case, Castile's girlfriend live-streamed his death on Facebook. The video gained approximately 3.2 million views by the next day.
 2020: George Floyd was murdered by a Minneapolis Police Department officer in an arrest filmed and uploaded on social media. Officer Derek Chauvin spent over nine minutes with his knee on Floyd's neck, asphyxiating him, despite pleas from onlookers to stop. The incident has sparked ongoing protests and riots across the United States.

Accountability 
Special commissions, such as the Knapp Commission in New York City during the 1970s, have been used to bring about changes in law enforcement agencies. Civilian review boards (permanent external oversight agencies) have also been used as a means for improving police accountability.  Review boards tend to focus on individual complaints, rather than broader organizational issues that may result in long-term improvements.

The 1994 Violent Crime Control and Law Enforcement Act authorized the United States Department of Justice's Civil Rights Division to bring civil ("pattern or practice") suits against local law enforcement agencies, to rein in abuses and hold them accountable.  As a result, numerous departments have entered into consent decrees or memoranda of understanding, requiring them to make organizational reforms. This approach shifts focus from individual officers to placing focus on police organizations.

Cost of Police Misconduct Act 

The Cost of Police Misconduct Act (H.R.8908) is a bill introduced to the House on 9 December 2020 by Rep. Don Beyer, proposed while incoming chair of the United States Congressional Joint Economic Committee, which seeks to create "a publicly accessible federal database that would track police misconduct allegations and settlements at both the state and federal levels".

Police reform

There have been many initiatives for police reform in the United States, notably since the 1960s, under President Lyndon Johnson, and several more recent efforts. In the 21st century, reforms based on community dialogue, legal requirements and updating of police training are growing. Nonetheless, instances of misconduct and brutality have continued to occur. Following the murder of George Floyd at the hands of a police officer, a number of reforms were implemented.

Calls for abolition 

While police resentment and calls for abolition of the police have existed in the United States for over a century, police abolition became more popular in 2014 following the killing of Michael Brown and the Ferguson unrest, with national attention being drawn to issues surrounding policing. The roots of police abolition stem from (and are often linked to) the prison abolition movement.

Authors and activists such as Angela Davis and Ruth Wilson Gilmore, who are best known for their prison abolition work, have integrated police abolition into their work when advocating against the carceral system of the United States.

In the summer of 2016, Chicago had a multitude of abolitionist actions and protests in response to the deaths of Michael Brown and Paul O'Neal, among others. This included the occupation of an empty lot across from a Chicago Police Department property, naming it "Freedom Square", as an experiment of a world without police.

In 2017, sociologist Alex S. Vitale authored The End of Policing, calling for police abolition as opposed to reforms.

Police abolition spiked in popularity following the murder of George Floyd by Minneapolis Police officer Derek Chauvin. A super-majority of the Minneapolis City Council (9 of 12 council members) pledged in June 2020 to dismantle the Minneapolis Police Department.

Entry qualifications
Nearly all U.S. states and the federal government have by law adopted minimum-standard standardized training requirements for all officers with powers of arrest within the state. Many standards apply to in-service training as well as entry-level training, particularly in the use of firearms, with periodic re-certification required. These standards often comply with standards promoted by the US Department of Justice and typically require a thorough background check that potential police recruits must take.

A typical set of criteria dictates that they must:

 Be a United States citizen (waived in certain agencies if the applicant is a lawful resident);
 Have a high school diploma or a GED and if necessary a college degree or served in the United States military without a dishonorable discharge;
 Be in good medical, physical, and psychological condition;
 Maintain a clean criminal record without either serious or repeated misdemeanor or any felony convictions;
 Have a valid driver's license that is not currently nor has a history of being suspended or revoked;
 Be of high moral character;
 Not have a history of prior narcotic or repeated marijuana use or alcoholism;
 Not have a history of ethical, professional, prior employment, motor vehicle, educational, or financial improprieties;
 Not have a history of domestic violence or mental illness;
 Not pose a safety and security risk;
 Be legally eligible to own and carry a firearm.

Repeated interviews, written tests, medical examinations, physical fitness tests, comprehensive background investigations, fingerprinting, drug testing, a police oral board interview, a polygraph examination, and a consultation with a psychologist are common practices used to review the suitability of candidates. Recruiting in most departments is competitive, with more suitable and desirable candidates accepted over lesser ones, and failure to meet some minimum standards disqualifying a candidate entirely. Police oral boards are the most subjective part of the process and often disqualifies the biggest portion of qualified candidates. Departments maintain records of past applicants under review, and refer to them in the case of either reapplication or requests between other agencies.

Training 

Police academies exist in every state and also at the federal level. Policing in the United States is highly fragmented, and there are no national minimum standards for licensing police officers in the U.S. Researchers say police are given far more training on use of firearms than on de-escalating provocative situations. On average, US officers spend around 21 weeks training before they are qualified to go on patrol, which is far less than in most other developed countries. Similar European training programs can last more than three years.

Equipment

Vehicles 
Police use a wide range of vehicles in their duties. Police vehicles are used for patrol, responses, and pursuits, and generally carry much of an officer's equipment, including communication devices and tools. Police vehicles in the United States have traditionally been sedans produced by the Big Three (Ford, General Motors, Stellantis), though SUVs, crossovers, pickup trucks, station wagons, and a wide variety of other vehicles have seen use among police departments historically and presently, in both standard and specialized roles.

Firearms
Police officers in the United States usually carry a handgun on duty. Many are required to be armed off-duty and often required to have a concealable off-duty handgun. Among the most common sidearms are models produced by Glock, Smith & Wesson, SIG Sauer, Beretta, and Heckler & Koch, usually in 9mm, .40 S&W, .357 SIG, or .45 ACP.

Until the late 1980s and early 1990s, most American police officers carried revolvers, typically in .38 Special or .357 Magnum calibers, as their primary duty weapons. At the time, Smith & Wesson, Colt, Ruger, and Taurus models were popular with police officers, the most popular being .38 caliber revolvers produced by Smith & Wesson or Colt. Since then, most agencies have switched to semi-automatic pistols due to their higher stopping power, higher rate of fire, and greater magazine capacity. Historic events influencing the switch to pistols by police included the 1980 Norco shootout, the 1986 FBI Miami shootout, and the 1997 North Hollywood shootout.

Some police departments allow qualified officers to carry shotguns, semi-automatic rifles, or (very rarely) submachine guns in their vehicles for additional firepower. These are typically intended to be used when their use would be necessary or ideal compared to handguns, such as when confronting an armed or armored suspect, or when a handgun would not provide the range, accuracy, or rate of fire required for the situation, such as when engaging a suspect from a distance or in close-quarters combat.

Less-lethal weapons
Police officers often carry an impact weapon—a baton, also known as a nightstick. The common nightstick and the side handle baton have been replaced in many departments by collapsible batons such as the ASP baton, though some departments continue to use them either as an option or out of tradition, such as the Baltimore Police Department's wooden espantoon batons. One advantage of the collapsible baton is that the wearer can comfortably sit in a patrol vehicle while still wearing the baton on their duty belt. The side handle nightstick usually has to be removed before entering the vehicle. Many departments also use less-lethal weapons such as mace, pepper spray, and beanbag shotgun rounds.

Another less lethal weapon that police officers often carry is an electroshock weapon, also known as a Taser. The handheld electroshock weapon was designed to incapacitate a single person from a distance by using electric current to disrupt voluntary control of muscles. An individual struck by a Taser experiences stimulation of their sensory nerves and motor nerves, resulting in strong involuntary muscle contractions. Tasers do not rely only on pain compliance, except when used in drive stun mode, and are thus preferred by some law enforcement over non-Taser stun guns and other electroshock weapons.

Specialized weapons

Most large police departments maintain special weapons and tactics (SWAT) units, police tactical units trained and equipped to handle situations such as barricaded suspects, hostage situations, terrorist attacks, and high-risk warrants that require greater force, specialized equipment, and special tactics that are unavailable to regular police officers. These units usually have submachine guns, automatic carbines or rifles, semiautomatic or pump-action combat shotguns, sniper rifles, stun grenades, smoke grenades, ballistic shields, door breaching tools, and other specialized weapons and equipment at their disposal. Some SWAT units are equipped with dedicated SWAT armored vehicles, trucks modified for police operations, or retired military vehicles acquired from the Law Enforcement Support Office. Others are capable of handling other non-combat-related tasks, such as the NYPD's Emergency Service Unit, which is capable of conducting rescue operations.

Armor and vests
Uniformed police officers often wear body armor, typically in the form of a lightweight Level IIA, II or IIIA vest that can be inconspicuously worn under uniforms, though some departments allow vests to be worn above uniforms with rigs and pouches installed to replace the typical duty belt.  Lightweight level IIA, II or IIIa vests are generally capable of stopping most handgun rounds. SWAT teams typically wear heavier Level III or IV tactical armored vests, often with steel or ceramic trauma plates, comparable to those worn by U.S. military personnel engaged in ground operations.  Level III or IV vests are more capable of protecting officers from rifle rounds. Officers trained in bomb disposal wear bomb suits designed to protect them from the effects of an explosion when working around live ordnance. Local police foundations have also initiated programs to provide law enforcement agencies with higher level vests that provide greater protection and vests for police dogs.

Body-worn camera 

Multiple states, such as California, Washington, and Illinois, among others, have pending body-worn camera legislation that requires its police officers to be equipped with body-worn cameras when the officers are on duty. Body-worn cameras are video recording devices around three inches long that cost between $129 and $900. There are different body-worn camera models, but a standard body-worn camera includes an on and off switch that enables the image capturing technology to record and store data in the cloud.

Body-worn cameras have become standard due to the rise of complaints about police brutality across the nation. Supporters argue that the use of a body-worn camera allows evidence to be viewed from an unbiased perspective. Body-worn camera models are being developed that are intended to resolve the technology's limitations, such as better audio capturing technology and battery life.

Drones

In recent years police have recruited unmanned surveillance devices such as small throwable robotics and flying drones to conduct reconnaissance in dangerous locations. These devices can be used to identify the presence of a hostage, locate and/or identify subjects, and reveal the layout of a room. The devices do all this by transmitting real-time audio and video to the pilot, giving police an advantage when they cannot directly see a suspect or enter a location where they are needed. Some other uses for this device may be bomb detection, as well as searching suspicious vehicles.

Flying drones are also being enlisted to help police in dangerous situations such as a barricaded suspect or a hostage situation. These drones increase safety by providing information that can be used in mapping and planning. These devices equipped with cameras allow officers to get a bird's eye view of a scene in an emergency, allowing responders to safely get much closer to a scene than they could if they went in on foot.

Police communications

Radio 
Most American police departments are dispatched from a centralized communications center, using VHF, UHF, or, more recently, digitally trunked radio transceivers mounted in their vehicles, with individual officers carrying portable handsets or ear-worn headsets for communication when away from their vehicles. American police cars are also increasingly equipped with mobile data terminals (MDTs) or portable computers linked by radio to a network allowing them access to state department of motor vehicles information, criminal records, and other important information.

Most police communications are now conducted within a regional pool of area telecommunicators or dispatchers using 9-1-1 and 9-1-1 telephone taxation. A large number of police agencies have pooled their 9-1-1 tax resources for Computer Aided Dispatching (CAD) to streamline dispatching and reporting. CAD systems are usually linked to MDTs.

National Law Enforcement Telecommunications System 
A variety of national, regional, state, and local information systems are available to law enforcement agencies in the U.S., with different purposes and types of information. One example is the National Law Enforcement Telecommunications System (NLETS), an interstate justice and public safety network owned by the states supporting inquiry into state systems for criminal history, driver's license and motor vehicle registration, as well as supporting inquiry into federal systems, such as the Department of Homeland Security (DHS) 's U.S. Immigration and Customs Enforcement (ICE) Law Enforcement Support Center, the Drug Enforcement Administration (DEA) National Drug Pointer Index (NDPIX), and the Federal Aviation Administration (FAA) Aircraft Registry and the Government of Canada's Canadian Police Information Centre (CPIC).

NLETS operates primarily through a secure private network through which each state has an interface to the network that all agencies within the state operate through. The federal and international components operate very similarly. Users include all U.S. states and territories, some federal agencies, and certain international agencies. The primary operational site for the network is housed in Arizona, with a secure backup site located in the East Central U.S.

Through the NLETS network, law enforcement and criminal justice agencies can access a wide range of information, from standard driver license and vehicle queries to criminal history and Interpol information. Operations consist of nearly 1.5 billion transactions a year to over one million PC, mobile, and handheld devices in the U.S. and Canada at 45,000 user agencies, and to 1.3 million individual users.

Dissemination 
Police departments share arrest information with third-party news organizations that archive names of citizens and legal allegations in a "police blotter". However, even if the allegations are dismissed in court, a citizen may not petition the third-party for removal.

Police population 

In 2008, federal police agencies employed approximately 120,000 full-time law enforcement officers, authorized to make arrests and carry firearms in the United States.

The 2008 Bureau of Justice Statistics' Census of State and Local Law Enforcement Agencies (CSLLEA), found there were 17,985 state and local law enforcement agencies employing at least one full-time officer or the equivalent in part-time officers.

In 2008, state and local law enforcement agencies employed more than 1.1 million people on a full-time basis, including about 765,000 sworn personnel (defined as those with general arrest powers). Agencies also employed approximately 100,000 part-time employees, including 44,000 sworn officers.

From 2004 to 2008, overall full-time employment by state and local law enforcement agencies nationwide increased by about 57,000 (or 5.3%). Sworn personnel increased by about 33,000 (4.6%), and nonsworn employees by about 24,000 (6.9%). From 2004 to 2008, the number of full-time sworn personnel per 100,000 U.S. residents increased from 250 to 251. From 1992 to 2008, the growth rate for support personnel was more than double that of sworn personnel.

Local police departments were the largest employer of sworn personnel, accounting for 60% of the total. Sheriffs' offices were next, accounting for 24%. About half (49%) of all agencies employed fewer than 10 full-time officers. Nearly two-thirds (64%) of sworn personnel worked for agencies that employed 100 or more officers.

In 2019, the FBI estimated that approximately 1,003,270 law enforcement personnel were employed nationwide and distributed across more than 13,250 agencies. Of those, 697,195 were sworn officers, with 306,075 civilian employees. According to FBI UCR's the total number of agencies (including federal agencies) in the United States dropped from 19,071 to 18,794 (excluding 277 federal agencies).

Demographics 
Law enforcement has historically been a male-dominated profession. There are approximately 18,000 law enforcement agencies at federal, state, and local level, with more than 1.1 million employees. There are around 12,000 local law enforcement agencies, the most numerous of the three types. In a 2013 survey, the Law Enforcement Management and Administrative Statistics found that 72.8% of local police officers were white. Black or African American were 12.2% (the black population in the United States is roughly 13%) and Latino or Hispanic are 11.6%. Women made up 17% of full-time sworn officers. Women, Asian, and Hispanic officers are significantly under-represented in police forces. Many law enforcement agencies are attempting to hire a diversity of recruits to better represent their communities.

Changes in personnel numbers 
Fifteen of the 50 largest local police departments employed fewer full-time sworn personnel in 2008 than in 2004. The largest declines were in Detroit (36%), Memphis (23%), New Orleans (13%), and San Francisco (10%).

Ten of the 50 largest local police departments reported double-digit increases in sworn personnel from 2004 to 2008. The largest increases were in Phoenix (19%), Prince George's County (Maryland) (17%), Dallas (15%), and Fort Worth (14%).

Salary 
Salary varies widely for police officers, with most being among the top third of wage-earners, age 25 or older, nationwide. The median annual wage for criminal investigators was $86,940 and $65,540 for patrol officers, in May 2020. The lowest 10 percent earned less than $38,420, and the highest 10 percent earned more than $146,000.

The median wages for police and detective occupations in May 2020 were as follows:

 $86,940 for detectives and criminal investigators
 $72,580 for transit and railroad police
$65,540 for police and sheriff's patrol officers
 $58,040 for fish and game wardens

Deaths 

The main cause of death to law enforcement officers are roadway related incidents. This includes both crashes and struck-by incidents. Between the years of 2011 and 2020, there were a total of 1,387 officer line-of-duty deaths excluding COVID-19 related deaths. Of these deaths, 286 officers died because of crashes or 21% of total deaths. In addition, 114 officers died because of struck-by incidents or 8% of total deaths.

Between 2005 and 2019, over 200 law enforcement officers died because of struck-by incidents. These deaths account for 24% of motor vehicle-related officer deaths. This can occur in many situations, but commonly occurs at traffic stops when officers are in or near roadways.

According to 2017 FBI figures and stated above, the majority of officer deaths on the job were the result of accidents rather than homicides.  Civilians faced a homicide rate of 5.6 per 100,000, while police faced a homicide rate of 3 per 100,000.

Throughout 2021, 262 officers have died from various medical conditions, the two leading causes were contracting COVID-19 (242) and heart attack (17), with 1 death associated with responding to the September 11 attacks. As of December, 2021, line-of-duty officer deaths totaled 126 (felonious and accidental).

The Officer Down Memorial Page (ODMP) has tracked approximately 26,237 officers who have died in the line of duty in the United States since 1776. A memorial is also hosted in Washington, DC, by the National Law Enforcement Officers Museum of the National Law Enforcement Officers Memorial Fund (NLEOMF).

Since January 1, 2022, authorized agencies are able to submit suicide information for their officers, based on the Law Enforcement Suicide Data Collection Act, enacted by the United States Congress in June 2020.

See also 

 Police academies in the United States
 Police officer certification and licensure in the United States
 Police ranks of the United States
 Police uniforms in the United States
 List of law enforcement agencies in the District of Columbia
 List of U.S. state and local law enforcement agencies

Related:
 Crime in the United States
 Incarceration in the United States
 Terrorism in the United States

General:
 Police

References

External links 

United States government, Department of Justice: Law enforcement in the United States, Resources
Police1.com is the #1 resource for law enforcement online
COPS Office: Office of Community Oriented Policing Services is a component of the United States Department of Justice.
POLICE Magazine
The National Sheriffs’ Association
Reserve Organization of America
Law Enforcement Community Relations Service - Department of Justice
Law Enforcement - United States Department of State
National Policing Institute
National Association of Police Organizations
Types of Law Enforcement Agencies - Discover Policing
U.S. Customs and Border Protection
U.S. Immigration and Customs Enforcement's (ICE)
Federal Bureau of Prisons
U.S. Marshals Service
U.S. Secret Service
ATF Bureau of Alcohol, Tobacco, Firearms and Explosives
DEA Drug Enforcement Administration
FBI Federal Bureau of Investigation
Homeland Security
IRS:CI Internal Revenue Service Criminal Investigation
Bureau of Prisons

 
Public services of the United States